Rochelle Watson is an Australian R&B and soul singer. She won the 1999 Deadly Award for Most Promising New Talent.

Discography
Black To Reality ep - Junga/Vonu

Charity
In July 2015, Rochelle became an official Ambassador for Kidney Health Australia.

References

Indigenous Australian musicians
Australian women singers
Living people
Year of birth missing (living people)